Ralph Sam Haeems (9 November 1940 – 31 March 2005) was a leading British criminal defence solicitor. He is credited with innovative defences in criminal cases, which, in some cases, created new legal precedents in UK appeals courts.

Early years
Haeems was born in Bombay (now Mumbai) to a Bene Israel Jewish family. His  parents were teachers. He attended Bombay University, earning his B.Sc degree in engineering. He came to England in 1962 to study for a master's degree in chemistry.

London
He found a position as an office clerk in the East End, placing bets for his employers and collecting the winnings. He was promoted to supervising the defense of a murder suspect, whom he helped to acquit. Haeems then found employment with an offer of an articled clerkship. In 1972 he qualified as a solicitor and five years later set up his own practice.

Notable cases
Haeems participated in the trials of George Ince, Dennis Nilsen, Russell Bishop and several defendants in the Brink's-Mat robbery.

Death
Haeems suffered a heart attack in January 2005 and underwent triple bypass surgery two months later. He died, aged 64, from complications which set in during the following weeks.

Family
He was survived by his wife Angela, whom he married in 1967, a son (a barrister) and two daughters (both solicitors).

References

External links
Obituary in The  Times (Online)

1940 births
2005 deaths
British Jews
British solicitors
Bene Israel
Scholars from Mumbai
Indian emigrants to England
British people of Indian-Jewish descent
20th-century English lawyers
University of Mumbai alumni
21st-century English lawyers